Tom Moran is a British screenwriter.

Career 
Moran attended the University of East Anglia. While studying for a degree in Scriptwriting and Performance, he set up Laugh Out Loud comedy club. He subsequently performed a 21-night show at the Edinburgh Fringe Festival. In 2014, Moran won the Guardian and Legend Press''' new prize for self-published fiction. The prize aims to find books "that are not only zeitgeisty and promising, but will be talked about in 10 or even 100 years' time." Following the prize, Moran has received attention in various publications including the Washington Post.

In 2015, Moran was named as one of the BAFTA Rocliffe New Comedy Writing Forum winners for his new sitcom, Printheads. The prize culminated in a showcase at the New York Television Festival, where professional actors performed the script live. At the festival, Moran won the AMC-Channel 4 Drama Co-Development Award for his sci-fi pilot White Rabbit.

Moran wrote and executive produced the Amazon Prime Video thriller television series The Devil's Hour''.

Screenwriter filmography

References

External links 
 

1987 births
Living people
21st-century British screenwriters
21st-century English male writers
Alumni of the University of East Anglia
English male comedians
English male novelists
English male screenwriters